Michael Piwowar is a former American federal government official who served as a Commissioner on the Securities and Exchange Commission from 2013 until 2018.

Education 
Piwowar earned a Bachelor of Arts in foreign service and international politics from Pennsylvania State University, Master of Business Administration from Georgetown University, and PhD in finance from Pennsylvania State University.

Career 
In 2014, Piwowar was one of only three Ph.D. economists to serve as an SEC commissioner, a rarity for a position normally given to lawyers. After graduating with a Ph.D. from Penn State University, Piwowar taught at Iowa State University. In 2008 and 2009, Piwowar served in the president's Council of Economic Advisers. Then he moved to the Senate, where he was a staffer for Republican senators Mike Crapo and Richard Shelby. Like his Democratic colleague at the SEC, Kara Stein, who was also a Senate staffer, Piwowar helped write the 2010 Dodd–Frank Act.

During his time at the SEC, Piwowar joined with his colleague and senior Republican Daniel Gallagher in dissenting to some of the agency's rules and enforcement actions. 
Piwowar has asked to observe meetings of Washington's super-regulator, the Financial Stability Oversight Council (FSOC), and criticized it as an "unaccountable capital markets death panel" that lacks transparency.

References

Living people
Members of the U.S. Securities and Exchange Commission
Place of birth missing (living people)
Year of birth missing (living people)
Trump administration personnel
Obama administration personnel